Statistics of Ekstraklasa for the 1967–68 season.

Overview
It was contested by 14 teams, and Ruch Chorzów won the championship.

League table

Results

Top goalscorers

References
 Poland – List of final tables at RSSSF 

Ekstraklasa seasons
1967–68 in Polish football
Pol